Luciano Pucci Burti (born 5 March 1975) is a Brazilian racing driver who briefly raced in Formula One. He is now a commentator for TV Globo.

Early career
Burti's early career saw him graduate through the usual channels and he found himself in British Formula 3 driving for the crack Stewart Racing team. In his second season of F3 in 1999 he finished runner-up to Marc Hynes, but it was third-placed Jenson Button who would go on to achieve stardom in Formula One. Burti impressed when testing the Stewart F1 car that season and became Jaguar's tester for 2000, mainly down to the lobbying of Jackie Stewart, the outgoing team-boss.

Formula One career

2000–2001
A surprise Grand Prix début came on 16 July 2000 at the Austrian Grand Prix, when he was called up at short notice as a replacement for the ill Eddie Irvine. Having tested consistently well for Jaguar in the 2000 Formula One season and with a race start already under his belt, he was promoted to the race team alongside Irvine in 2001, replacing the retiring Johnny Herbert. However, he fell out of favour after just four races, and was replaced by ex-Arrows driver Pedro de la Rosa.

Burti found a seat immediately at Prost, where the underperforming Gastón Mazzacane had been sacked. Burti raced competently for Prost and recorded his highest finish - eighth place - at the Canadian Grand Prix; he also occasionally qualified ahead of his highly experienced teammate Jean Alesi. However, his most notable moment in the first half of the season was an accident at the German Grand Prix - unable to avoid the slowing Ferrari of Michael Schumacher, whose gearbox had failed seconds after the race start, Burti struck the back of Schumacher's car, launching his Prost into a destructive cartwheel over the Arrows of Enrique Bernoldi. None of the three drivers were injured and all took the restarted race, from which Burti spun out on the 23rd lap.

Crash at 2001 Belgian Grand Prix
Two races later he had a more serious crash at the Belgian Grand Prix when his car touched with Eddie Irvine as he attempted to overtake the Northern Irishman. The front wing became lodged under Burti's front wheels, allowing him no braking or steering into the 190 mph Blanchimont corner; the impact with the tire barrier was so great that segments of the barrier were thrown into the air, landing on Burti's cockpit and knocking him unconscious. Irvine, after suffering a sizeable impact himself, subsequently helped the marshals in their attempt to extract Burti from his car. The crash forced him to sit out the rest of the season with facial bruising and a concussion. His seat was taken by Czech rookie Tomáš Enge.

2002–2004
Burti subsequently signed to test for the Ferrari team, but that came to an end at the end of his contract in 2004. Over the course of his Formula One career, he scored no championship points. He has since returned to Brazil, where he competes in Stock Car Brasil and commentates on Formula One races for TV Globo.

Racing results

Complete Formula One results
(key)

Complete Stock Car Brasil results

† As Burti was a guest driver, he was ineligible for points.

References

Sources
Profile at www.grandprix.com

External links

 Luciano Burti official website

1975 births
Living people
Brazilian racing drivers
Brazilian Formula One drivers
British Formula Three Championship drivers
Racing drivers from São Paulo
Brazilian people of Italian descent
Jaguar Formula One drivers
Prost Formula One drivers
Stock Car Brasil drivers
TC 2000 Championship drivers
Brazilian expatriates in Italy
Brazilian expatriates in Monaco
Brazilian expatriate sportspeople in the United Kingdom
Porsche Supercup drivers
24 Hours of Spa drivers
Paul Stewart Racing drivers